Two ships in the United States Navy have been named USS Hopewell.

  was a  launched in June 1918 and transferred to the Royal Navy in September 1940
  was a  launched in May 1943

United States Navy ship names